Mont Bellevue is a peak standing , situated in a public park located in the borough of Mont-Bellevue in Sherbrooke, Quebec. Claiming 20% of the total park land, it is the largest park in Sherbrooke.

Etymology
Belle vue translates to "beautiful view" in English. The mountain, its park, and the borough in which it lies are named after "the magnificent landscape one discovers at its summit."

History 
The Université de Sherbrooke, built in 1954, originally used the land for sports, recreation, education, and research. In 1959, the City of Sherbrooke constructed the first ski lift on the mountain, signaling the beginning of the development of Mont Bellevue for public recreational purposes. Between 1959 and 1975, the city reserved 45 hectares of land for alpine skiing, tennis, archery, and various trails.

In 1976, the City of Sherbrooke undertook park management and maintenance. To this day, the City of Sherbrooke continues to improve the park with consideration for the environment through the Regroupement du Mont Bellevue organization.

In August 2013, Mont Bellevue was one of the venues for the Canada Games. In preparation for the event, the Club de vélo de montagne de Sherbrooke was granted CA $300,000 for the improvement of the park's mountain bike course.

Recreation

Mont Bellevue houses a small alpine skiing station that has six tracks and a chalet at which visitors may rent skiing, snowboarding, or snowshoeing equipment. Other winter activities available in the park include cross-country skiing, winter walking, and snow tubing. Summer visitors may participate in hiking, mountain biking, cycling, archery, tennis, jogging, and geocaching.

Wildlife
Wildlife observers often view deer, squirrels, groundhogs and chipmunks in the park. Less commonly observed mammals include porcupine, skunks, foxes and raccoons. Among the many types of avian species in the mountain, birders may view blue jays, cardinals, wood thrush, veery, and ruffed grouse. Reptiles on the mountain include brown snakes and garter snakes, while numerous types of amphibians, molluscs, and insects also occupy the space.

Flora
A variety of wildflowers, ferns, trees, edible plants, and fungus inhabit the mountain.

Flowers

 Trout lilies
 Pink turtlehead
 Lily of the valley
 Foamflower
 Blue cohosh
 Pink streptope
 Solomon's seal
 Painted trillium
 Pink lady's slipper
 Jack-in-the-pulpit
 Common hemp-nettle
 Euphrasia
 Silvery cinquefoil
 Common mullein
 Indian pipe
 Pinesap
 Ground pine

Fruits and vegetables

 Ramps
 Horseradish
 Blueberry
 Juneberry
 Raspberry and wineberry
 Nannyberry
 Blackberry
 Chokecherry
 Apple
 Wild strawberry
 Elderberry

Trees
 Striped maple
 American basswood

Invasive species
Buckthorn, honeysuckle, and Japanese knotweed are among the invasive plants on the mountain.

Black slug
The black slug is an invasive pest native to Europe that was transported to the area during the construction of the Université de Sherbrooke in the 1950s. Windows imported from England in wooden crates padded with straw are thought to have contained eggs from the pest.

From there, they took to the Mont Bellevue Park, where the soil humidity is conducive to their locomotion, and where their massive size and lack of shell means they easily outcompete native species. The black slug also has few natural predators in North America, meaning it is a threat to the stability of the ecosystems on the mountain.

There is concern that the molluscs might spread to other parts of town via accidental transportation by automobiles that stay for long periods of time in the Mont Bellevue or university parking areas.

Eradication efforts
In 2008, residents of the Mont-Bellevue and Mont-Sainte-Anne sectors surrounding the park reported major issues with the critters, who are known for decimating gardens. City councillors deferred their complaints to provincial ministers.

In early 2009, the city drew up plans to pursue the eradication of the slugs, granting CA $12,000 to Environtel 3000 so the company could analyze the scope and distribution of the pests. However, that summer saw yet another worrisome abundance of the pest.

The report revealed that 15-20% of the slugs begin their reproductive cycle early, allowing for the growth of two generations per year instead of one. Warm autumns and winters, as well as wet springs and summers, promote the growth of the slug population.

Following the report, the city began the production of informative brochures detailing the steps homeowners can take to get rid of the pests on their properties.

References

External links
  Official website for the park
  Official website of the Regroupement du Parc du Mont-Bellevue

Landforms of Sherbrooke
Mountains of Quebec under 1000 metres
Ski areas and resorts in Quebec
Protected areas of Estrie
Landforms of Estrie